The Gilpin Homestead, also known as General Howe Headquarters, is a historic home which is located in Chadds Ford, Delaware County, Pennsylvania. 

It was added to the National Register of Historic Places in 1971.

History and architectural features
The original house was built in 1754, and consisted of a brick building with two basement rooms, two first-floor rooms, two bedrooms, and the attic. Sometime around 1811, a stone addition was built that is now the middle of the house, and a second stone addition was completed by 1859. 

A porch was added between 1870 and 1897, and the garage was attached in 1949. Also located on the property are a carriage house-barn, small barn, spring house, a creamery-cheese house, and the stone remains of a barn built in 1860. 

William Howe, 5th Viscount Howe used the Gilpin house as his headquarters from late afternoon of September 11, until the morning of September 16, 1777, after the Battle of Brandywine.

The 1754 section was added to an earlier house, probably built in the 1730s. This was eventually torn down to allow for the nineteenth century additions. There is not, and never was a staircase in the 1754 section, but visible on the plaster wall in the present stair hall, is the "witness" of the original stair.

It was added to the National Register of Historic Places in 1971.

See also
National Register of Historic Places listings in Delaware County, Pennsylvania

References

Houses on the National Register of Historic Places in Pennsylvania
Houses completed in 1754
Houses in Delaware County, Pennsylvania
1754 establishments in Pennsylvania
National Register of Historic Places in Delaware County, Pennsylvania
Chadds Ford Township, Delaware County, Pennsylvania